Ben Eardley (born 29 December 1999) is a Scottish footballer, currently playing for Greenock Morton's under-20 side.

Club career
Eardley came through the Greenock Morton youth academy to become part of the successful under-20 side.

In August 2017, Eardley went out on a development loan to local Junior club Greenock Juniors.

He made his debut as a late substitute at Cappielow against Inverness Caledonian Thistle in April 2018. At the end of that season, Eardley signed a further one-year contract until 10 June 2019.

International career
In November 2012, Eardley was called up to the SFA's regional performance squad.

Personal life
Eardley attended St Kenneth's Primary School and Notre Dame High Schools in Greenock.

Honours
SPFL Development League West: Winners (2) 2015-16, 2017-18

References

External links

  

1999 births
Association football defenders
Association football midfielders
Greenock Morton F.C. players
Living people
Port Glasgow F.C. players
Scottish footballers
Scottish Junior Football Association players
Scottish Professional Football League players
Footballers from Greenock
Greenock Juniors F.C. players